Monroe, Wisconsin is a city in Green County.

Monroe, Wisconsin may also refer to:
Monroe, Adams County, Wisconsin, a town
Monroe (town), Green County, Wisconsin, a town

See also
Monroe Center, Wisconsin, an unincorporated community
Monroe County, Wisconsin